Propstburg is an unincorporated community in Pendleton County, West Virginia, United States, on the South Fork South Branch Potomac River.

Climate
The climate in this area has mild differences between highs and lows, and there is adequate rainfall year-round.  According to the Köppen Climate Classification system, Propstburg has a marine west coast climate, abbreviated "Cfb" on climate maps.

References

Unincorporated communities in West Virginia
Unincorporated communities in Pendleton County, West Virginia